Tu Mi Piaci (Italian for "I like you") is an EP of cover songs by Xiu Xiu, released on June 20, 2006 on Acuarela.

Future Xiu Xiu member Angela Seo took the photograph on the cover.

Track listing
 "He Needs Me" (Nina Simone) – 2:00
 "Don't Cha" (Pussycat Dolls) – 4:00
 "Kangaroo" (Alex Chilton) – 4:12
 "Blueberry Mine Shaft" (Nedelle) – 2:52
 "All We Ever Wanted Was Everything" (Bauhaus) – 4:52

References

External links
 Acuarela (record label)

2006 EPs
Xiu Xiu albums